Bionicle is a series of direct-to-video computer-animated science fantasy action films based on the toyline of the same name from Lego.

In total, four films have been released. The first three from Miramax serve as the original trilogy, while Universal's Bionicle: The Legend Reborn served as a soft-reboot. The fourth film takes place on a different planet with new characters, which was intended to start a new saga of films in the series, but sequels were ultimately scrapped following Bionicle's cancellation in 2010.

Films

Original trilogy

Bionicle: Mask of Light (2003)
The first film began production in 2002, with production being completed in 13 months. The film was co-directed by Terry Shakespeare and David Molina of Creative Capers Entertainment with Bionicle co-creator Alastair Swinnerton, Henry Gilroy and Greg Weisman serving as writers. Sue Shakespeare, Janice Ross and Stig Blicher served as producers. It was the only film in the series to be written by Greg Weisman, who was fired during production for “yawning”.

Bionicle 2: Legends of Metru Nui (2004)
Production on the second film was completed in 12 months, one month shorter than the first feature. The film was co-directed by Terry Shakespeare and David Molina of Creative Capers Entertainment with Henry Gilroy, Greg Klein, Tom Pugsley and Elliot Gabrel serving as screenwriters, with a story by Bob Thompson and Henry Gilroy. Sue Shakespeare served as producer.

Bionicle 3: Web of Shadows (2005)
Originally intended for a theatrical release, the film was co-directed by Terry Shakespeare and David Molina of Creative Capers Entertainment with Brett Matthews serving as screenwriter, with a story by Bob Thompson, Henry Gilroy and Greg Farshtey. Sue Shakespeare and Bob Thompson served as producers.

Stand-alone film

Bionicle: The Legend Reborn (2009)
The film was directed by Mark Baldo with Sean Catherine Derek serving as writer, with a story by Greg Farshtey. Kristy Scanlan and Joshua Wexler served as producers.

Music

The first three films were composed by Nathan Furst, while John D'Andrea composed the fourth film. Mask of Light, Legends of Metru Nui and Web of Shadows had their soundtracks released on March 10, December 12, and December 22, 2017, respectively by Rising Phoenix Records, although The Legend Reborn’s soundtrack has yet to be released.

Television series
A four-episode streaming television mini-series titled Lego Bionicle: The Journey to One was released by Netflix from March 4 through July 29, 2016 to tie-in with the reboot.

Characters 

 A dark grey cell indicates the character did not appear in that film.
 An  indicates an older version of a character.
 A  indicates a younger version of their character.

Release
The first film, Bionicle: Mask of Light, had its world premiere at Legoland in Carlsbad, California on September 13, 2003, and was released in the United States on September 16, 2003, three days after the premiere, on VHS and DVD by Buena Vista Home Entertainment under the Miramax Home Entertainment label.

The second film, Bionicle 2: Legends of Metru Nui, had its world premiere at the El Capitan Theatre in Hollywood, Los Angeles, California on October 6, 2004, and was released in the United States on October 19, 2004, on VHS and DVD by Buena Vista Home Entertainment under the Miramax Home Entertainment label.

The third film, Bionicle 3: Web of Shadows, was released in the United States on October 11, 2005, on DVD by Buena Vista Home Entertainment under the Miramax Home Entertainment label.

A fourth stand-alone film, Bionicle: The Legend Reborn, had its world premiere at Legoland in Carlsbad, California on August 29, 2009, and was released in the United States on September 15, 2009, on DVD by Universal Studios Home Entertainment.

Promotion
Cartoon Network's anime block, Toonami, hosted a sweepstakes contest for the television premiere of the first film, Bionicle: Mask of Light. Viewers could call-in the channel's number to have a chance to win prizes that included miscellaneous Bionicle sets, one Magnavox 36” TV, one Magnavox Progressive Scan DVD player, as well as the addition of one lucky winner receiving a Platinum Avohkii mask. For the film, fast food chain Burger King also released a set of Kids Meal toys in the United Kingdom. Later Cartoon Network would host another sweepstakes contest on the Miguzi block, for the television premiere of the third film, Bionicle 3: Web of Shadows, where viewers could yet again call-in the channel's number and have the chance to win miscellaneous Bionicle sets as well as one lucky winner receiving a life-size Visorak Keelerak statue made out of Lego pieces. Scholastic, one of the biggest publishing corporations in the world, also released books made to tie-in with the films from the original trilogy.

Reception

Critical response
The first installment, Bionicle: Mask of Light, received generally positive reviews from journalists upon its release, however in retrospect, has been criticized for its dated visuals. Matthew Attanasio of Comic Book Resources noted that the animation held up but stating for character animations that they are  “hit or miss." He also said that the story was "pretty straightforward" while also stating that Takua and Jaller made "great protagonists.", however was disappointed to see the Toa, mainly Onua, have little screen time.

The second installment, Bionicle 2: Legends of Metru Nui, received mixed reviews from journalists upon its initial release, however in retrospect, has been viewed more favorably compared to its predecessor, with it being praised for its upgrade in animation, however has been criticized for its filling in of plot holes from the first film. Matthew Attanasio of Comic Book Resources gave a negative review of the film, stating "LEGO's decision to focus on prequel material was received as a slap in the face." He added that the positive aspects of the film included its animation, but also criticized the editing, saying it, like the past film, "maintains the problem of poor editing to the point of being laughably bad."

Accolades

Notes

References

Bionicle
Bionicle (film series)
Film series introduced in 2003
Miramax franchises
Children's film series
Toy franchises
Film franchises
Science fiction film series
Lego themes